Nepheloleuca politia is a species of geometrid moth in the family Geometridae. It is found in the Caribbean Sea, Central America, and North America.

The MONA or Hodges number for Nepheloleuca politia is 6985.

References

Further reading

External links

 

Ourapterygini
Articles created by Qbugbot
Moths described in 1777